Andrew is the English form of a given name in many countries.

Andrew may also refer to:

Places
Andrew (MBTA station) in Boston, Massachusetts, US
Andrew, Alberta, Canada
Andrew, Iowa, US
Andrew, West Virginia, US
Andrew County, Missouri, US
Port Andrew, Wisconsin, US

Other
Andrew (surname)
Andrew Corporation, manufacturer of antenna system hardware
Andrew oilfield, in the UK sector of the North Sea
Andrew Project, a Carnegie Mellon University computer project
Andrew File System, the project's file system 
, names of three Royal Navy ships
Hurricane Andrew, hurricane which struck the US in 1992
"The Andrew", a nickname for the Royal Navy

See also 
Andie
Andrea
Andreas (disambiguation)
Andres (disambiguation)
Andrews (disambiguation)
Andy (disambiguation)
List of people with given name Andrew
Drew (disambiguation)
Saint Andrew (disambiguation)
St. Andrew's Cross (disambiguation)